Abraham Gabriel (16th to 17th-century) was a Palestinian rabbi of probable Italian origin who lived at Safed. He was a disciple of the kabbalist Isaac Luria and is mentioned in Hayyim Vital's Book of Visions. Gabriel was ordained by Jacob Berab II in 1594 and served as a legal arbiter on the Safed beth din (law court). He also acted as leader of the Italian congregation of the city. In 1603 he travelled to Sidon as an emissary for Safed. His censura were prefixed to various Hebrew works published at that period, including in the She'elot ve-Teshuvot of Yom Tov Tzahalon (Venice 1694).

References

Rabbis in Safed
16th-century rabbis from the Ottoman Empire
17th-century rabbis from the Ottoman Empire
Sephardi rabbis in Ottoman Palestine